Tha Ruea Noi railway station is a railway station located in Tha Ruea Subdistrict, Tha Maka District, Kanchanaburi Province.

References 

Railway stations in Thailand
Kanchanaburi province